"Honey", also known as "Honey (I Miss You)", is a song written by Bobby Russell. He first produced it with former Kingston Trio member Bob Shane, who was the first to release the song. It was then given to American singer Bobby Goldsboro, who recorded it for his 1968 album of the same name, originally titled Pledge of Love. Goldsboro's version was a hit, reaching No. 1 in several countries.

In the song, the narrator mourns his absent wife, and the song begins with him looking at a tree in their garden, remembering how "it was just a twig" on the day she planted it. Only in the third verse is it finally revealed that "one day...the angels came," and that his wife is deceased.

Background
"Honey" was written by Bobby Russell and he produced the song recorded by Bob Shane.  Goldsboro had heard the song, and in need of songs to record, he and his producer Bob Montgomery invited Russell over to play a few of his songs including "Honey", and asked if he could cover the song. Russell was initially reluctant as Shane's version was due to be released but eventually agreed that Goldsboro could record it as long as his single did not compete with Shane's record. They agreed to delay it by four weeks. 

The song was recorded on January 30, 1968. According to Goldsboro, the recording session for the song went so well that they got it right in one go.  They then recorded it again just to see if anything was wrong, and it came out just as well, so they went with the first take.

Release
"Honey" was released as a single in the U.S. in February 1968. While Shane's recording reached only 104 on the Bubbling Under chart, Goldsboro's version quickly reached the top of the chart in April. It spent five weeks at No. 1 on the Billboard Hot 100 singles chart (the 200th song to reach No. 1 on that chart), from April 7 to May 11, and three weeks atop Billboard Hot Country Singles chart. It was preceded on the Billboard Hot 100 by "(Sittin' on) the Dock of the Bay" by Otis Redding and was followed by Archie Bell & the Drells' "Tighten Up". It was Goldsboro's only No. 1 hit on the Pop Singles and Country Singles charts and it was his first song to top the Adult Contemporary chart. Billboard ranked the record as the No. 3 song for 1968.

"Honey" reached No. 2 on the UK Singles Chart and a re-release of the single in the United Kingdom in 1975 reached No. 2 again. In Australia, it spent four weeks at No. 1 on the ARIA Charts, replacing the Beatles' "Lady Madonna", and was the No. 6 song of 1968.

Reception
"Honey" was immediately and immensely popular. It sold a million copies in its first three weeks, the fastest-selling record in the history of United Artists. It was certified gold on April 4, 1968, the same day that Martin Luther King Jr. was assassinated, an event that may have helped the sales of the single. It was the best-selling record worldwide for 1968, even more popular than "Hey Jude". It was a crossover hit, topping both the pop and country singles charts, one of only three songs to do so in the 1960s. The recording was nominated for two Grammy Awards in 1968: Record of the Year and Best Contemporary-Pop Vocal Performance, Male. It was awarded Song of the Year in 1968 by the Country Music Association.

There were also foreign versions: in Italy, for example, the well-known author Daniele Pace wrote lyrics in the local language with the title Amore, mi manchi (My love, I miss you). This cover version was recorded by Bobby Solo, Peppino Gagliardi, the late Roman singer Giuliana Valci and by Goldsboro himself. 

Today the song is sometimes dismissed or disparaged, its contemporary popularity notwithstanding. It has been called "innocuous pop", "classy schlock", more "dreadful" than Pavarotti, and, hyperbolically, the "Worst Song of All Time" by a writer whose ambivalent antipathy left him "transfixed" by "one of the biggest songs of the year." In a 2011 poll, Rolling Stone readers ranked "Honey" the second-worst song of the 1960s.

Chart performance

Weekly charts
Bobby Goldsboro

Year-end charts

All-time charts

Peter Lotis

Distant Galaxy (medley)

O.C. Smith

See also
List of Billboard Hot 100 number-one singles of 1968

References

External links 

 

1968 songs
1968 singles
1975 singles
1960s ballads
Bobby Goldsboro songs
Songs written by Bobby Russell
Song recordings produced by Bob Montgomery (songwriter)
Songs about death
Songs about loneliness
United Artists Records singles
Number-one singles in Australia
Number-one singles in New Zealand
Billboard Hot 100 number-one singles
Cashbox number-one singles
Irish Singles Chart number-one singles
RPM Top Singles number-one singles
Andy Williams songs
Dean Martin songs
Frankie Laine songs
Gary Puckett & The Union Gap songs
Lynn Anderson songs
Tammy Wynette songs